The flag of the Lesser Poland Voivodeship, Poland is a tricolour rectangle, with three horizontal stripes: white, yellow, and red, with the top and bottom stripes being twice the size of the middle one.

Design 
The flag of the Lesser Poland Voivodeship is a tricolour rectangle, with the aspect ratio of height to width of 5:8. It consist of three horizontal stripes: white, yellow, and red, with the top and bottom stripes being twice the size of the middle one. The colour of the flag had been adopted from the coat of arms of the Lesser Poland Voivodeship, which depicts the white eagle with a golden (yellow) crown, legs, and a band put throw his wings, located within a red escutcheon.

History 
The flag had been adopted by the Lesser Poland Voivodeship Sejmik, on 24 May 1999, in the resolution no. VIII/73/99. It had been designed by Barbara Widłak, Wojciech Drelicharz, and Zenon Piech.

See also 
 coat of arms of the Lesser Poland Voivodeship
 flag of Galicia and Lodomeria

References 

Lesser Poland Voivodeship
Lesser Poland Voivodeship
Lesser Poland Voivodeship
1999 establishments in Poland